Operation Delphin was an anti-partisan operation in the Independent State of Croatia that took place in World War II, from 15 November to 1 December 1943. The objective of the mission was to destroy the Partisan elements on the Dalmatian islands off central Dalmatia.

The Axis forces included:
 114th Jäger Division (main force)
 264th Infantry Division (elements)
 Küstenjäger-Abteilung (Coastal Raiders Battalion) "Brandenburg"
 DKM Flak cruiser Niobe, 1 destroyer, several gunboats, 2 armed steamers, 3 Siebel ferries, and numerous smaller ships, boats and landing craft.

Result 
The operation, which was amphibious, it ran relatively according to plan, but most of the Partisans appear to have avoided engaging the German forces. Some of them escaped to the island of Vis farther out into the Adriatic. It is not thought that the operation was very successful.

References 

Delphin
Delphin
Delphin
Delphin
November 1943 events
December 1943 events